Spiers is an English surname. Notable people with the surname include:

Alexander Spiers (1807–1869), English lexicographer
Bob Spiers (1945–2008), British television director 
Cyril Spiers (1902–1967), former English professional footballer and manager
Dick Spiers (1937–2000), English footballer
 Edward Louis Spiers, later Edward Spears (1886–1974), British Army officer and politician
Elizabeth Spiers (born 1976), the founding editor of gossip blog Gawker.com and the Wall Street gossip site dealbreaker.com
Felix William Spiers (1832–1911), founder of Spiers & Pond, restaurateurs
Hetty Spiers (1881–1973), theatre and film costumier and screenwriter
John Spiers (born 1975), English squeezebox player, founder member of folk duo Spiers and Boden and Bellowhead
Reg Spiers (born 1941), Australian athlete known for traveling in a wooden box from England to Australia
Richard Phené Spiers (1838–1916), English architect and author
Ronald I. Spiers (1925–2021), former American ambassador-diplomat and member of Diplomats and Military Commanders for Change
Sarah Spiers, victim of the Claremont serial killings

Business
Stewart Spiers, Scottish firm of plane-makers, founded in 1840, later Stewart Speirs Ltd [sic]

See also
Spears
Speir
Speirs